The prince dwarf gecko (Lygodactylus regulus) is a species of gecko endemic to Mozambique.

References

Lygodactylus
Reptiles described in 2013
Reptiles of Mozambique
Endemic fauna of Mozambique